Semyonovka is a rural locality (a selo) and the administrative center of Semyonovskoye Rural Settlement, Kalacheyevsky District, Voronezh Oblast, Russia. The population was 666 as of 2010. There are 7 streets.

Geography 
Semyonovka is located 36 km west of Kalach (the district's administrative centre) by road. Rossokhovatoye is the nearest rural locality.

References 

Rural localities in Kalacheyevsky District